The Parks Trust (originally, the Milton Keynes Parks Trust) is a British registered charity formed in 1992 by Milton Keynes Development Corporation to take over the public parks in Milton Keynes, Buckinghamshire.

The Trust's chief executive is Victoria Miles MBE.

Many of the parks feature significant public art, particularly in Campbell Park.

Milton Keynes is unusual in that most of the parks are owned and managed by a Trust rather than the local authority (Milton Keynes City Council),  to ensure that the management of MK's green spaces are largely independent of the council's expenditure priorities.

Together, the Parks Trust and the City Council manage  of parkland, woodland and other open space across the City of Milton Keynes unitary authority area.

Locations
Notable parks include Willen Lake in the east (the most popular public green space in Milton Keynes), Stanton Low Country Park in the north-west, and Howe Park Wood in the south-west, as well as various forest and nature reserves and floodplains around MK.

References

External links

Organisations based in Milton Keynes
Organizations established in 1992
1992 establishments in England
Parks and open spaces in the Borough of Milton Keynes